Elke Clijsters and Barbora Strýcová were the defending champions, but they did not compete in the Juniors this year.

Alisa Kleybanova and Sania Mirza defeated Kateřina Böhmová and Michaëlla Krajicek in the final, 2–6, 6–3, 6–2 to win the girls' doubles tennis title at the 2003 Wimbledon Championships.

Seeds

  Jarmila Gajdošová /  Andrea Hlaváčková (first round)
  Kristína Czafiková /  Kirsten Flipkens (first round)
  Kateryna Bondarenko /  Olena Tsutskova (quarterfinals)
  Casey Dellacqua /  Adriana Szili (quarterfinals)

Draw

Draw

References

External links

Girls' Doubles
Wimbledon Championship by year – Girls' doubles